Barton-under-Needwood is a civil parish in the district of East Staffordshire, Staffordshire, England.  It contains 42 buildings that are recorded in the National Heritage List for England.  Of these, three are listed at Grade II*, the middle grade, and the others are at Grade II, the lowest grade.  The parish contains the villages of Barton-under-Needwood and Barton Turn, and is otherwise rural.  The Trent and Mersey Canal runs through the parish, and the listed buildings associated with this are two bridges and two mileposts.  Most of the other listed buildings are a church, houses and associated structures, cottages, farmhouses and farm buildings, the earliest of which are timber framed or have timber-framed cores.


Key

Buildings

References

Citations

Sources

Lists of listed buildings in Staffordshire